Tim Ho Wan is a Hong Kong dim sum restaurant chain originating from Hong Kong. Known for being "the world's cheapest Michelin-star restaurant", the chain has since expanded and now has franchises in 12 countries.

History 
Tim Ho Wan was founded in March 2009 by Mak Kwai-pui (a former chef at three Michelin star restaurant Lung King Heen) and Leung Fai-keung, with their first location being a 20-seater restaurant in Mong Kok. Mak had stated that, "the food scene in Hong Kong globalized and I saw less and less authentic Cantonese food", and that by opening Tim Ho Wan he wanted to "keep the tradition alive at an affordable price". The name Tim Ho Wan means "to add good luck". 

Within a year of opening, the original Tim Ho Wan in Mong Kok gained a michelin star.

Local Expansion 

The original Mong Kok location relocated to Olympian City in 2013, and the chain has 5 additional branches in Hong Kong.

Franchise 
The Tim Ho Wan Group is owned by Mak and Leung (50% equity holding each), and the group owns all branches in Hong Kong. The Group also collects fees by franchising out their brand globally; all Tim Ho Wan head chefs at these franchised locations must be experienced dim sum chefs, and go through a mandatory 4-week training session in Hong Kong.

Asia-Pacific 
The Asia-Pacific franchise rights are held by Tim Ho Wan Private Limited, and includes 39 branches in 9 Asia-Pacific markets (excluding Hong Kong, as Tim Ho Wan Group retains direct control of their Hong Kong branches, and excluding Japan). The master franchise rights were acquired by Jollibee Foods Corporation for approximately USD 33 million in 2018.

Europe, the USA, and Japan 
The franchise rights in Europe, the United States, and Japan are held by Japanese dining group WDI Group. They currently operate 8 branches, with 2 in Tokyo, 2 in New York City, 1 in Irvine, CA, 1 in Las Vegas, 1 in Waikiki, and 1 in Katy, TX.

References

External links

 

Michelin Guide starred restaurants in Hong Kong
Restaurants in Hong Kong
Restaurants in the Philippines